is a Japanese judoka . After moving up from the –66 kg division to the –73 kg division, he won the gold medal in the lightweight (73 kg) division at the 2010 World Judo Championships.

He married volleyball player Ai Ōtomo in 2013.

References

External links
 

1986 births
Living people
Japanese male judoka
Asian Games medalists in judo
Judoka at the 2006 Asian Games
Judoka at the 2010 Asian Games
Judoka at the 2014 Asian Games
Asian Games gold medalists for Japan
Asian Games bronze medalists for Japan
Medalists at the 2006 Asian Games
Medalists at the 2010 Asian Games
Medalists at the 2014 Asian Games
Sportspeople from Kumamoto Prefecture